CICZ-FM is a Canadian radio station, broadcasting at 104.1 FM in Midland, Ontario. The station, owned by Bell Media, airs an adult hits format branded as Bounce 104.1.

History
Midland-Penetang Broadcasting Ltd. opened CKMP 1230 AM on July 1, 1959 with studios at 196 Dominion Avenue in Downtown Midland. The "MP" in the call letters was for the towns of Midland and Penetanguishene. CKMP was home to many well-known announcers, including Jim Van Horne, Brian Henderson, Dan McLean and Ken Rowland.

The studios moved in 1990 to a new facility on Cranston Crescent off Highway 12 in Midland, in a facility that also housed Telemedia's community newspapers. On June 3, 1992, CKMP was given permission to rebroadcast the programming of co-owned CFOR in Orillia between 1:00 and 6:00 a.m. (with local inserts). When the simulcast began, CKMP's format changed from AC gold to country.

CKMP moved to 104.1 FM in 1994, changing call letters to CICZ-FM, while CFOR became CICX-FM, broadcasting at 105.9 FM. Both stations were branded as KICX-FM, sharing announcers and programming for much of their daily schedule. This arrangement continued until CICX switched to the "EZ Rock" format in 1996.

Larche Communications purchased CICZ from Telemedia in 1997, and acquired CICX from Rogers Communications in 2007.

On March 3, 2008, Larche moved the country format to CICX, replacing the Orillia station's former "Jack FM" format, and adopted the classic rock format on CICZ. Most recently, the station adopted a classic hits format as 104.1 The Dock.

In July 2011, Larche Communications applied to increase CICZ-FM's power from 9,354 watts (20,000 watts Max. ERP) to 33,500 watts (100,000 watts Max. ERP). This application was denied on June 4, 2012.

On August 9, 2017, Bell Media announced that it would acquire CICZ. Bell Media received approval from the CRTC on February 14, 2018.

As part of a mass format reorganization by Bell Media, on May 18, 2021, CICZ shifted to adult hits, and adopted the Bounce branding.

References

External links
 Bounce 104.1
 
 
  (OLD frequency and call sign)

Ikz
Ikz
Midland, Ontario
Radio stations established in 1959
1959 establishments in Ontario
ICZ